The 1947 Cork Intermediate Hurling Championship was the 38th staging of the Cork Intermediate Hurling Championship since its establishment by the Cork County Board in 1909.

Ráth Luirc won the championship following a 4-07 to 4-04 defeat of Newtownshandrum in the final. This was their third championship title overall and their second title in succession.

References

Cork Intermediate Hurling Championship
Cork Intermediate Hurling Championship